Miles is a rural town and locality in the Western Downs Region, Queensland, Australia.

Geography 

History 
Formerly known as Dogwood Crossing, the town is situated on Dogwood Creek, named by German explorer Ludwig Leichhardt in 1844. The town was renamed Miles in honour of the Queensland Colonial Secretary, William Miles. Miles Post Office opened on 3 January 1878.

Miles Provisional School opened on 31 May 1880, becoming Miles State School on 18 January 1886.

Holy Cross School opened in 1926. It closed on 15 December 1989.

The Miles War Memorial and Wall of Remembrance was erected by the former Murilla Shire Council and dedicated on 25 April 1967.

Miles State High School opened on 30 January 1979.

Miles Library facility opened in 2002. it houses a high-speed ISDN Internet Connection (powered through the National Broadband Network) with Brisbane through the State Library of Queensland

Economy
The economy of Miles is based mainly on agriculture and cropping, producing wheat, sorghum, barley and cotton. Timber production is another area of economic activity and in common with much of Western Queensland, cattle and sheep grazing, including feedlots is widespread.

A mining industry utilising rich deposits of bentonite clay is developing.

In addition, there are the following developing industries:
 Coal seam gas
 coal mining
 electricity generation

Education 

Miles State School is a government primary (Early Childhood-6) school for boys and girls at Constance Street.  In 2016, the school had an enrolment of 223 students with 18 teachers (16 full-time equivalent) with 12 non-teaching staff (9 full-time equivalent). In 2018, the school had an enrolment of 214 students with 19 teachers (17 full-time equivalent) and 14 non-teaching staff (9 full-time equivalent). It includes a special education program certified under the National Disability Insurance Scheme.

Miles State High School is a government secondary (7-12) school for boys and girls at Pine Street. In 2016, the school had an enrolment of 190 students with 22 teachers (21 full-time equivalent) and 20 non-teaching staff (13 full-time equivalent). In 2018, the school had an enrolment of 182 students with 18 teachers and 17 non-teaching staff (12 full-time equivalent). It also includes a special education program certified under the National Disability Insurance Scheme

Amenities 
Western Downs Regional Council operates Miles Library at Dogwood Crossing on the corner of Dawson and Murilla Streets and has a broadband ISDN Internet Connection to Brisbane (powered through the National Broadband Network).

Redeemer Lutheran Church is at 114 Murilla Street.

The Miles branch of the Queensland Country Women's Association has its rooms in Corbett Drive.

Attractions 
Miles Historical Village Museum is at 141 Murilla Street. It is laid out in the style of town main street in an early Queensland rural town. There are 34 buildings including 15 historic structures relocated from the local area. It regarded as one of the best historical villages in Australia, and is used as a film set and special events venue, in addition to its normal operations as a museum. Every 2 years the town hosts the Miles Back to the Bush Festival in September, in and around the Miles Historical Village. The festival is the town's biggest event and features bush style entertainment with a vintage twist.

Transport 
Miles is connected to Brisbane, Toowoomba and Roma by the Warrego Highway and Goondiwindi and Rockhampton by the Leichhardt Highway. Greyhound Australia operates daily bus services between Brisbane and Mount Isa via Longreach and Charleville and between Toowoomba and Rockhampton, via Miles and also to Charleville.

The Westlander train also comes through Miles twice a week, on its way between Brisbane and Charleville, at very early hours of Wednesday & Friday mornings (Westbound Service 3S86) and Thursdays & Saturdays (Eastbound Service 3987).

Climate 
Winter mornings can be very cold and frost is common.

References

External links

 
 
Sydney Morning Herald Travel
Dogwood Crossing - The local gallery, library and IT resource centre.

Towns in Queensland
Towns in the Darling Downs
Western Downs Region
Localities in Queensland